Ciprian Porumbescu is a commune located in Suceava County, Bukovina, northeastern Romania. It is composed of a single village, namely Ciprian Porumbescu. It was part of Ilișești commune, theretofore called Ciprian Porumbescu, until 2004, when it was split off to form a separate commune. The commune was named in honor of Romanian composer Ciprian Porumbescu, who died there in 1883. Until 1953, it was called Stupca.

References 

Communes in Suceava County
Localities in Southern Bukovina